Vaklinovo (until 1960 - Marulevo) is a village in Southwestern Bulgaria. It is located in the Satovcha Municipality, Blagoevgrad Province.

Geography 

The village of Vaklinovo is located in the Western Rhodope Mountains. It belongs to the Chech region.

History 

In 1873 Vaklinovo (Maroulévo) had male population of 175 Bulgarian Muslims and 63 houses. According to Vasil Kanchov, in 1900, Vaklinovo (Марулево) was populated by 300 Bulgarian Muslims According to another statistic by Kanchov about the same time there were 50 houses in the village. According to Stephan Verkovic at the end of the 19th century the village had male population of 208 Bulgarian Muslims and 63 houses.

Religions 

The population is Muslim and consists of Bulgarian Muslims.

Notes 

Villages in Blagoevgrad Province
Chech